Aage Rasmussen (later Remfeldt; 4 September 1889 – 29 November 1983) was a Danish photographer and track and field athlete who competed in the 1912 Summer Olympics. He was born in Frederiksberg and died in Havdrup, Solrød municipality.

In 1912 he finished fourth in the 10 kilometre walk event.

References

External links
Olympic profile
bio 
Fotohistorie profile 

1889 births
1983 deaths
Danish male racewalkers
Olympic athletes of Denmark
Athletes (track and field) at the 1912 Summer Olympics
Danish photographers
People from Frederiksberg